Independent Industrialists and Businessmen Association (MÜSİAD), is a non-governmental organization. According to 2021 records, MÜSİAD has 89 contact points in Turkey, 255 contact points in 73 different countries, and more than 11 000 members. 
The association holds an ISO 9001:2000 Quality Certificate. The association has representatives in every province of Turkey.

MÜSİAD organizes an annual defense industry fair called High-Tech Port by MÜSİAD. The second fair was held between 6–8 October 2015 in Doha, Qatar, and promoted billions of dollars of trade between Turkey and Qatar. MÜSİAD also supports Turkey’s Housing Developers and Investors Organization (KONUTDER) exhibitions to increase real estate trade ties to investors from the Gulf.

See also
Turkish Industrialists and Businessmen Association (TÜSİAD)
Turkish Confederation of Businessmen and Industrialists (TUSKON)

External links
www.musiad.org.tr/en
www.musiad.us

Activity 

 MÜSİAD Vizyoner: "Vizyoner" Summit, organized every 2 years by "MUSIAD", the non-governmental organization where Turkey's most powerful and universally widespread business people come to seek; It is an event organized for the benefit of the society in order to inform the business people of Turkey and the world, to prepare them for the future and to help them develop trust-oriented business connections.
 MÜSİAD Vizyoner 2021 - in Istanbul on December 22

References

Business organizations based in Turkey
Conservatism in Turkey
Organizations established in 1990
Organizations based in Istanbul
1990 establishments in Turkey